Canarino mannaro is an album by Italian singer Mina, issued in 1994.

Track listing

CD 1
 Che mi importa del mondo - 3:55
 Va bene, va bene così - 5:30
 Wave - 5:07
 Oro / La canzone del sole - 6:03
 Il posto mio - 5:29
 Je so pazzo - 3:43
 'Na voce 'na chitarra (e 'o poco 'e luna) - 4:37
 Crazy - 5:46
 Rosso - 4:29
 Come Together - 7:42

CD 2
 Noi - 5:27
 Fosse vero - 4:23
 Rotola la vita - 4:48
 Tu dimmi che città - 4:05
 Non è niente - 5:02
 Amore - 5:20
 In onda - 4:41
 Tornerai qui da me - 4:59
 Continuando - 4:23
 Impagliatori d'aquile - 4:12

1994 albums
Mina (Italian singer) albums